Baeckea polystemonea, commonly known as the desert rock-myrtle, is a shrub found in central Australia.

It blooms between April and August producing pink and white flowers.

It is found on sand plains and rocky hillsides in central parts of the Goldfields-Esperance region of Western Australia near the border with South Australia and the Northern Territory and extending into southern parts of the Northern Territory where it grows in skeletal sandy soils over quartzite.

The species was first formally described by the botanist Ferdinand von Mueller in 1861 in the work Fragmenta Phytographiae Australiae

See also
List of Baeckea species

References

Flora of Western Australia
Flora of the Northern Territory
polystemonea
Plants described in 1861
Taxa named by Ferdinand von Mueller